Nicolae "Nicușor" Claudiu Stanciu (born 7 May 1993) is a Romanian professional footballer who plays as an Attacking midfielder or a winger for Chinese Super League club Wuhan Three Towns and the Romania national team.

He began his career with Unirea Alba Iulia and went on to represent Vaslui and Steaua București in his country, winning six domestic honours and making a name for himself with the latter. He moved abroad to Anderlecht in August 2016, becoming the then-most expensive signing made by a Belgian club and later, after bonuses, the then-biggest sale of the Romanian championship.

Stanciu transferred to Sparta Prague one and a half-year later for another internal record fee. He left the Czech Republic at the start of 2019 to sign for Al-Ahli, only to return in that summer to the country with former rival club Slavia Prague, where he helped to back-to-back league titles in his first two seasons.

Stanciu made his senior international debut for Romania in March 2016, after having previously represented it at under-19 and under-21 levels. He participated with the nation at UEFA Euro 2016.

Early life
Stanciu was born in the village of Craiva from Cricău, Alba County. He was raised mainly by his grandmother, who died in 2007 when he was only 14 years old. He dedicated his first senior national team goal to her.

Club career

Unirea Alba Iulia
Stanciu joined Unirea Alba Iulia's youth system at the age of 11. On 25 May 2008, aged just 15 years and 18 days, he made his senior debut for the team, coming off the bench in a 4–1 victory over Corvinul Hunedoara in the Liga II championship. He spent the vast majority of the 2008–09 season on the sidelines, after suffering a long-term injury. On 1 May 2010, 17-year-old Stanciu made his Liga I debut under manager Blaž Slišković, playing 20 minutes in a 2–1 home win against Steaua București. In June, he was on trial with VfB Stuttgart, but the economic discrepancies between the two clubs made the transaction collapse.

On 20 March 2011, Stanciu scored his first goal for Unirea in a 3–0 success over Petrolul Ploiești, and he also wore the captain's armband in the closing stages of the match following Adrian Câmpeanu's substitution. His last came on 20 August with the side again in the second division, in the campaign opener against CSM Râmnicu Vâlcea; during his spell, other than Stuttgart, he was tracked by various European clubs, including Brescia, Celtic and 1899 Hoffenheim.

Vaslui
On 9 September 2011, FC Vaslui paid Stanciu's release clause. Due to a transfer ban, "the Yellow-Greens" were initially unable to register the player and fellow league teams Dinamo București and Astra Ploiești tried to sign him. On 4 March 2012, in his competitive debut for his new club, he scored the 2–1 winner at Petrolul Ploiești. In May 2012, after a series of good performances, Stanciu was included by Sport.ro in a Top 10 list of Romanian youths to watch. On 30 August, he netted from the penalty spot in a 2–2 away draw against Internazionale in the play-off round of the UEFA Europa League, but his side had lost 0–2 in the first leg.

FCSB
On 27 March 2013, FCSB announced the signing of Stanciu for an undisclosed fee, with the player agreeing to a five-year deal with a €20 million buyout clause. He played all twelve matches in the 2013–14 edition of the UEFA Champions League, scoring in the 2–2 away draw against Legia Warsaw in the play-off round which assured qualification to the group stage.

After the departure of Cristian Tănase in the summer of 2015, Stanciu took over his number 10 jersey, also extending his contract in February 2016 until 2021. 2015–16 was his most prolific season individually, as he netted 14 times in 39 competitive games. On 3 August 2016, Stanciu scored twice against Sparta Prague in the Champions League third qualifying round's second leg. He also found the net in the first match, in an eventual 3–1 aggregate triumph.

Anderlecht

On 29 August 2016, amid interest from various European sides including Chelsea, Stanciu travelled to Belgium to sign a five-year contract with Anderlecht. The latter agreed to pay an initial €7.8 million for his transfer, with bonus clauses taking the potential fee to €9.8 million. Therefore, he became the then-most expensive player bought by a Belgian club, ahead of former record holder Steven Defour (€6 million, from Porto to Anderlecht in 2014)– in November 2017, his agent confirmed that the additional €2 million had been paid, which also made him the Romanian championship's most expensive sale after surpassing the €9.5 million move of Vlad Chiricheș to Tottenham Hotspur in 2013. 

Stanciu made his debut in the Belgian Pro League on 11 September 2016, starting in a 3–2 home victory over Charleroi and receiving a standing ovation as he was substituted in the 85th minute by Olivier Deschacht. His first goals for the club came on 3 November in a Europa League group stage match against Mainz, when he netted twice for a 6–1 win. On 5 December, he was sent off for the first time in his career after receiving a second yellow card while playing against Kortrijk, having previously scored in the first half of the game which Anderlecht won 3–1.

Stanciu netted his first goal of 2017 in a league game against Sint-Truiden on 22 January, with his performance also earning him a man of the match award. On 9 March, he scored the winner against APOEL in the Europa League round of 16's first leg. He ended his first season in Brussels with eight goals and eight assists in all competitions, as the team won the national championship and subsequently qualified for the Champions League group stage. At the beginning of the following campaign, Stanciu changed his squad number from 73 to 10. He was a starter in the 2–1 win in the Belgian Super Cup against Zulte Waregem, on 22 July 2017.

Sparta Prague
On 18 January 2018, Stanciu underwent a medical with Sparta Prague. The transfer was confirmed five days later, with the player penning a three-and-a-half-year deal for an undisclosed fee, rumoured to be around €4.5 million which would be a Czech Republic record. According to the press, Anderlecht could also receive another €4.5 million in add-ons. On his competitive debut on 18 February 2018, Stanciu helped to a 2–0 win against Slovan Liberec after scoring in the fifth minute. On 17 March, he netted twice before half-time in a derby with Slavia Prague which ended 3–3. He finished the 2017–18 campaign with six goals in fourteen appearances, all in the Czech First League.

Stanciu played in both legs of the 2018–19 Europa League second qualifying round against Spartak Subotica, as his team was eliminated prematurely after 3–2 on aggregate. He netted his first goal of the season on 12 August 2018, converting a free kick in a 4–0 away victory over Teplice. In early December, after a series of poor results for Sparta, he was supposedly among the eleven players who refused to train under coach Zdeněk Ščasný.

Al-Ahli
On 28 January 2019, Stanciu was transferred for a €10 million fee to Saudi Arabian club Al-Ahli. He recorded his debut in the Saudi Professional League on 7 February, in a 4–2 away win over Al-Hazem, and scored his first goal nine days later in an Arab Club Champions Cup 2–2 draw with Al-Wasl.

Slavia Prague
Following financial issues at Al-Ahli, in July 2019 Slavia Prague acquired a reported 65% of Stanciu's economic rights for €4 million, with the player signing a four-year contract.

Wuhan Three Towns
On 15 February 2022, Stanciu joined Chinese Super League club Wuhan Three Towns.

International career

Stanciu was selected in Romania's squad for the 2011 UEFA European Under-19 Championship. In the tournament opener, he featured the full 90 minutes against the Czech Republic, scoring in a 3–1 loss in an eventual group stage exit.

Stanciu earned his first cap for the full side on 23 March 2016, playing the second half of a friendly with Lithuania and netting the game's only goal at the Stadionul Marin Anastasovici. On 17 May, he was picked by manager Anghel Iordănescu for his preliminary 28-man UEFA Euro 2016 squad, and eventually made it to the final list after scoring four goals in only five friendly games. He was awarded the number 10 shirt at the tournament in France, and started in the opener against the hosts, gaining a second-half penalty that was converted by Bogdan Stancu in an eventual 2–1 loss; his other appearance was against Albania (90 minutes), the 0–1 defeat leading to group phase elimination.

On 4 September 2016, Stanciu assisted Adrian Popa as Romania scored their first goal of the 2018 FIFA World Cup qualifiers, in a 1–1 home draw to Montenegro where he also missed a late penalty. He made nine appearances and netted once, as the country finished fourth in the group phase. In June 2021, Stanciu was one of two Romanian players who refused to take the knee before a friendly match away to England. He said he was protesting against a ten-match ban given to his Slavia Prague teammate Ondřej Kúdela, who reportedly racially insulted Rangers' Glen Kamara; Stanciu believed evidence was insufficient.

Style of play
Stanciu, who is predominantly right-footed but is good with both legs, primarily plays as an attacking midfielder but can also be used as a winger, and is known for his playmaking skills. He was described as having "good technique, a great shot and vision of play."

During the time after his national team debut, Romanian press drew comparisons between him and former internationals Gheorghe Hagi and Adrian Mutu, both of which were highly regarded by Stanciu.

Personal life
In 2012, Stanciu began a relationship with Andreea Beldean, a native of Alba Iulia. They married in 2018 and the wedding took place the following year. Their daughter was born in November 2020.

Career statistics

Club

International

Scores and results list Romania's goal tally first, score column indicates score after each Stanciu goal.

Honours
Unirea Alba Iulia
Liga II: 2008–09

Steaua București
Liga I: 2013–14, 2014–15
Cupa României: 2014–15
Cupa Ligii: 2014–15, 2015–16
Supercupa României: 2013

Anderlecht
Belgian First Division A:  2016–17
Belgian Super Cup: 2017

Slavia Prague
Czech First League: 2019–20, 2020–21
Czech Cup: 2020–21

Wuhan Three Towns
Chinese Super League: 2022

Individual
Gazeta Sporturilor Romanian Footballer of the Year 2022; runner-up: 2016, 2021; third place: 2019, 2020
Digi Sport Liga I Player of the Month: November 2015, March 2016
Czech First League Foreign Player of the Year: 2019–20, 2020–21
Czech First League Midfielder of the Year: 2019–20
Czech First League Fans' Player of the Year: 2020–21
Czech First League Player of the Month: March 2021
Czech First League top assist provider: 2019–20

References

External links

1993 births
Living people
People from Alba County
Romanian footballers
Association football midfielders
Liga I players
Liga II players
CSM Unirea Alba Iulia players
FC Vaslui players
FC Steaua București players
Belgian Pro League players
R.S.C. Anderlecht players
Czech First League players
AC Sparta Prague players
Saudi Professional League players
Al-Ahli Saudi FC players
SK Slavia Prague players
Chinese Super League players
Wuhan Three Towns F.C. players
Romania youth international footballers
Romania under-21 international footballers
Romania international footballers
UEFA Euro 2016 players
Romanian expatriate footballers
Expatriate footballers in Belgium
Romanian expatriate sportspeople in Belgium
Expatriate footballers in the Czech Republic
Romanian expatriate sportspeople in the Czech Republic
Expatriate footballers in Saudi Arabia
Romanian expatriate sportspeople in Saudi Arabia
Expatriate footballers in China
Romanian expatriate sportspeople in China